Gordon Maitland Chater AM (6 April 1922 – 12 December 1999) was an English Australian comedian and actor, and recipient of the Gold Logie, he appeared in revue, theatre, radio, television and film, with a career spanning almost 50 years.

Biography

Early life

Chater was born in Bayswater, West London and attended Cottesmore School as a child. He attended Cambridge University to study medicine but did not finish his degree, instead taking part in many student revues.

Radio and theatre

Chater arrived in Australia following World War II.  He first came to prominence in Australia as a stage and radio actor, and was a cast member of the 1963 Sydney season of Chekhov's The Cherry Orchard, the debut production by the Old Tote Theatre Company, the precursor to the Sydney Theatre Company. He appeared in a radio program opposite Gwen Plumb

Television roles

Chater became a national TV star when he was cast with Carol Raye and Barry Creyton in the Australian satirical television series The Mavis Bramston Show, for which he won the 1966 Gold Logie Award for Most Popular Personality on Australian Television.  He cemented his popularity with the title role in the popular sitcom My Name's McGooley, What's Yours?, playing the elderly live-in father of a young married couple, played by John Meillon and Judi Farr. He appeared in many other television comedy series. His fellow actors included Ray Barrett, Stewart Ginn and Charles "Bud" Tingwell, among others.

Chater was critical of early Australian television direction which he characterised as too often "'feet, knees and in the distance pictures'. People watching TV are interested in people and close ups in Australia were hard to come by in the early days of Australian television."

Stage roles in Australia

Amongst work in many other shows, Chater appeared in:
 The Rocky Horror Show in Brisbane in 1988
 The Sydney Theatre Company production of The Importance of Being Earnest as both "Lane" and "Merriman" in 1990.
 Lady Bracknell's Confinement at the Playhouse, in Melbourne in 1993.

Gordon Chater later worked in the United States, including appearing on Broadway.

In the 1970s Chater was particularly associated with the play The Elocution of Benjamin Franklin by Steve J. Spears, the stage role for which he became best known. The play broke new ground in Australian theatre with its shocking opening scene (in which Chater walked onstage naked) and its discussion of paedophilia.

Honours and awards

 Winner of the Macquarie Radio Award in 1952 for Comedy Performance on Radio
 Winner of the Gold Logie in 1966 for Most Popular Personality on Australian Television (The Mavis Bramston Show)
 Member of the Order of Australia (AM), 1999

Selected TV roles

References

External links
 Gordon Chater – Stage acting credits
 "The Dictionary of Performing Arts in Australia — Theatre . Film . Radio . Television — Volume 1" — Ann Atkinson, Linsay Knight, Margaret McPhee — Allen & Unwin Pty. Ltd., 1996
 "The Australian Film and Television Companion" — compiled by Tony Harrison — Simon & Schuster Australia, 1994

 
 Gordon Chater Dies aged 77 – Australian Broadcasting Corporation
 My Name's McGooley – What's Yours? – Classic Australian Television
 The Mavis Bramston Show – Nostalgia Central
 The History of The Mavis Bramston Show
 Tributes 1999 – Gordon Chater – Mark Juddery Tributes

Male actors from London
English male stage actors
English male television actors
Australian male stage actors
British emigrants to Australia
1922 births
1999 deaths
Gold Logie winners
20th-century Australian male actors
Members of the Order of Australia
20th-century English male actors